Crystal Lake is a  body of water in the Big Snowy Mountains in Fergus County, Montana, United States. The lake is located 18 miles south of Lewiston in the Lewis and Clark National Forest. The Forest Service's Crystal Lake Campground is located at the lake's southern tip. The lake is stocked annually with rainbow trout.

References

External links
Crystal Lake Bathymetric Map Montana Fish, Wildlife & Parks

Lakes of Montana
Bodies of water of Fergus County, Montana